Lagunillas is the capital city of the municipality of Sucre in the state of Mérida, Venezuela.
The old town is of interest to tourists.
The town is known for the large number of artifacts created with local materials.

Lagoon

The city is in a semi-arid zone in the middle basin of the Chama River, with a warm, dry climate.
It contains the Laguna de Urao, a natural lagoon that helps cool the air, and adds humidity, named after an indigenous word for sodium sesquicarbonate, which is found in the lake. This material was traditionally used to make . This lagoon is full of brackish water.
The French chemist Jean-Baptiste Boussingault (1801–1887) discovered the mineral Gaylussite in the lagoon in 1826.
It is named for the French chemist Joseph Louis Gay-Lussac (1778-1850).
The lagoon was declared a natural monument on 18 June 1979. However, areas surrounding the lagoon were left open to development, leading to a continuing deterioration in the lagoon's quality, as well as to a slow decrease in its size. An NGO was created in 2016 to protect the lagoon.
In February 2017 residents of the Sucre municipality denounced the deterioration of drying up of the Urao Lagoon, the main tourist attraction in the area, which they attribute to indiscriminate construction of housing and to climate change.
They blamed the local authorities for issuing construction permits and the environmental authority for failing to implement protective measures.

Miscellaneous

An oil camp for Shell Venezuela workers in Lagunillas was designed by the architect José Lino Vaamonde in 1954.
This was a self-contained community where the workers were isolated from the "wild" exterior.
Vaamonde also designed the Lagunillas Craft Training Center (1953).

Notes

Sources

Cities in Mérida (state)